Emil Scheel  (born 18 March 1990) is a retired Danish professional footballer who plays as a midfielder.

Career
Scheel started his career at Lyngby BK, but soon made the  switch to AGF, because he was studying in Aarhus, though only playing for the AGF reserves. In the winter of 2011 he became a permanent part of the AGF first-team and got his debut at home against FC Fredericia on 21-4-2011. On 7 August 2013 he signed a 2-year contract with Silkeborg IF.

Scheel signed with SønderjyskE on 7 January 2017, starting from the summer 2017.

On 3 August 2021, 31-year old Scheel announced his retirement from football due to a knee injury.

References

External links
 – Emil Scheel

1990 births
Living people
Danish men's footballers
Aarhus Gymnastikforening players
Association football midfielders
People from Gentofte Municipality
Lyngby Boldklub players
Silkeborg IF players
SønderjyskE Fodbold players
Viborg FF players
Danish Superliga players
Danish 1st Division players
Sportspeople from the Capital Region of Denmark